Liberty is a town in Amite County, Mississippi. It is part of the McComb, Mississippi micropolitan statistical area. It is the county seat of Amite County.

The town can be accessed via I-55, then west on Mississippi Highway 24. McGehee Air Park is located about a mile west of town.

Liberty celebrates its Heritage Days Festival during the first weekend of each May.

Air Cruisers manufacturing plant is located in Liberty. Owned by Zodiac Aerospace, the plant produces evacuation slides, life rafts, and life vests for the aviation industry.

Eleven sites in or near Liberty are listed on the National Register of Historic Places.

History

Liberty was incorporated on February 24, 1809. The Amite County Courthouse in Liberty is the oldest in Mississippi. Erected in 1839, the courthouse was enlarged and modernized in 1936. It is listed on the National Register of Historic Places.

The Amite Female Seminary (also known as the 'Little Red Schoolhouse'), built in 1853, was a girls finishing school located in Liberty.  During the American Civil War, in the spring of 1863, Federal troops under the command of Colonel Benjamin Grierson, a former music teacher, burned the school, but spared the school's music building.  The Federal commander permitted musical instruments to be removed, and was prepared to give the order to torch the building, when he recognized the music school's director, Rev. Milton Shirk, as a former classmate from New York.  The two-story, two-room music building survives to this day on Mississippi Highway 569, and is listed on the National Register of Historic Places.

Gail Borden, who developed a process in the early 1850s for condensing milk and founded the New York Condensed Milk Company (later known as Borden Inc., lived in Liberty from 1822 to 1829.

Between 1904 and 1921, a branch of the Liberty–White Railroad, a narrow-gauge logging rail line serving the White Lumber Company, ran between McComb, Mississippi and Liberty.

During the Civil Rights Movement, in September 1961, Herbert Lee, an African-American dairy farmer and member of NAACP, was murdered in Liberty at the Westbrook Cotton Gin by E.H. Hurst, a white state legislator. Lee had attended voter registration classes and volunteered to try to register to vote, Witnesses to the killing were intimidated by armed white men in the courtroom to support Hurst's claim of self-defense, and he was released without charges. Louis Allen, a married African-American landowner with a logging business, reported the truth about the crime to federal officials while seeking protection for testimony. He did not get protection. He suffered economic blackmail, arrests and harassment, and was killed in January 1964.

Liberty was the location of the fourth-wettest tropical cyclone in Mississippi in 2001; Tropical Storm Allison dropped  of precipitation.

Liberty, Texas is thought to have been named after this town, as numerous families from Amite County moved west in the 1820s to settle in the Atascosito district north-east of Houston.

Geography

Demographics

As of the 2020 United States census, there were 560 people, 282 households, and 184 families residing in the town.

Education
The town of Liberty is served by the Amite County School District. Liberty is also the home of Amite School Center, a K-12 education institution that is a member of the Mississippi Association of Independent Schools. The town manages a state property named the Ethel Stratton Vance Natural Area, just west of town, which is often used for educational purposes and is home to sports fields, camping areas, a large equestrian center, and over 200 acres of biologically diverse ravines, beaver impoundments, and bottomland hardwood forest along the West Fork Amite River.

Notable people
 Louis Allen, property owner and logger
 T. F. Badon, member of the Mississippi House of Representatives from 1952 to 1956
 L. C. Bates, African-American civil rights activist and the husband of Daisy Bates.
 James Brown, former American football offensive lineman
 Will D. Campbell, minister, author, and civil rights activist
 Jerry Clower, country comedian
 E. H. Hurst, member of the Mississippi House of Representatives
 Gabe Jackson, American football player for the Oakland Raiders, Las Vegas Raiders and Seattle Seahawks of the National Football League (NFL)
 Herbert Lee, civil rights activist
 William F. Love, U.S. Representative from Mississippi
 Glenn Moore, softball coach
 Clyde V. Ratcliff, member of the Louisiana Senate from 1944 to 1948, was born in Liberty in 1879
 Andy Rodgers, (March 14, 1922 – August 14, 2004) was a Delta blues harmonicist, guitarist, singer and songwriter born nearby Liberty in 1922
 Jamie Lynn Spears, actress and singer
 George H. Tichenor, inventor of an antiseptic, briefly lived and married in Liberty

References

External links
 Liberty website

Cities in Mississippi
Cities in Amite County, Mississippi
Towns in Mississippi
County seats in Mississippi
Towns in McComb micropolitan area